Lynnette Seah Mei Tsing is a Singaporean violinist serving as co-leader of the Singapore Symphony Orchestra (SSO). She received the Cultural Medallion for Music in 2006.

Early life
Seah began her formal music training on the piano with her mother Lau Biau Chin, when she was five. She started the violin at the age of six with Goh Soon Tioe and later with Alphonso Anthony, a professional violin teacher. When she was 15, Seah was appointed as Associate Concertmaster of the Bishop Symphony Orchestra at the International Music Camp in Adelaide, Australia. That same year she represented Singapore in the Southeast Asian Violin Competition, and won a scholarship to study at the Hannover Hochschule for Music in Germany. Renowned violin teachers she had worked with included David Mankowitz of Toronto, Prof. Friedrich von Hausegger of Hannover, Prof. Karel Sneberger of Prague, Yfrah Neaman of London and Dorothy DeLay of New York.

Musical career 
As a soloist, Seah has performed with various orchestras around the world, such as the Janáček Philharmonic Orchestra], Gstaad Menuhin Festival Orchestra, Orebro Chamber Orchestra, Teplice Symphony Orchestra, and Zurich Symphony Orchestra. Seah has also played in many festivals, which include the Bergen International Festival, Singapore Arts Festival and the Swiss Festival. In 2005, Seah commissioned Singaporean composer Bernard Tan to compose a concerto, Violin Concerto, dedicated to her. The concerto premiered on 7 January 2006 at Singapore's Esplanade Concert Hall by Seah herself with the SSO with Chinese-American conductor Lan Shui.

Seah is also active in the chamber music scene. She is the leader and founder of the Jade String Quartet, one of the few professional chamber music groups in Singapore.

Seah is also a founding member of the Singapore Symphony Orchestra.

Other than being a soloist or a concertmaster, Seah is also a member of the Advisory Committee for the "Violin Loan Scheme", a scheme by the Singapore National Arts Council. She is a member of the Singapore's Education Ministry's Arts Education Committee, which oversees various arts institutions such as the Nanyang Academy of Fine Arts, the Yong Siew Toh Conservatory of Music and the LASALLE College of the Arts.

In 1997, the Composers and Authors Society of Singapore conferred on Seah the Excellence Award in recognition of her contribution to Singapore's classical music scene. In 2006, Seah was awarded the Cultural Medallion for Music of 2006, which is the highest award for arts in Singapore.

Seah has appeared as guest on both TV and radio programmes. Singapore's Mediacorp Channel News Asia has made a documentary on Seah's musical life, entitled Inspir' Asia. This documentary is regularly broadcast on TV throughout Asia.

Seah plays on a 1750 Giovanni Battista Gabrielli's violin.

Award 
In 2006, SSO nominated Seah for the Cultural Medallion for Music of 2006. She was later informed by the SSO that she was awarded the cultural award. On 20 October, Seah received the award from the President of Singapore, S R Nathan at the Istana. She performed Bach's Partita No.3 and Elgar's Salut d'Amour during the award ceremony.

"This is a big milestone for classical musicians like myself, who've actually been training and dedicating and sacrificing my entire life, since childhood, towards this classical art form. I hope with this award, there'll be more awareness of classical music." —Lynnette Seah

Personal life 
Seah was married to Hans Simon and later divorced. They have two sons, Maurice and Andre.

References

External links
Lynnette Seah – Biography
https://www.sso.org.sg/about/singapore-symphony-orchestra/the-orchestra/lynnette-seah

1957 births
Living people
Singaporean people of Chinese descent
Singaporean musicians
Singaporean classical violinists
Recipients of the Cultural Medallion
21st-century classical violinists
Women classical violinists